= Dafydd ap Huw'r Gof =

17th-century Welsh poet

Dafydd ap Huw'r Gof (fl. 1610–1657) was a Welsh poet. He is known to have been from the Bodedern area of Anglesey, but little else is known about him.

He is thought to have composed a number of free metre verses, but it is not known if any still survive.
